The women's triple jump at the 2022 European Athletics Championships took place at the Olympiastadion on 17 and 19 August.

Records

Schedule

Results

Qualification

Qualification: 14.40 m (Q) or best 12 performers (q).

Final

References

Triple jump
Triple jump at the European Athletics Championships
Euro